Aliza Shenhar is a professor, author and was President of Emek Yezreel College who served as Israel's ambassador to Russia (1994–1997) and deputy mayor of Haifa.

Biography
Shenhar was born Rosh Pina where her father worked as a laborer. The family moved to Haifa when she was four years old. She attended Hebrew University of Jerusalem and majored in popular literature. In 1991, she became the University of Haifa's first female Rector as well as the first female to hold that position in Israel. In 1991 she "headed the Shenhar Committee, which examined Jewish education in Israeli public schools."

In 2003, she was the Israeli Labor Party nominee for mayor of Haifa. However, facing a lack of support, she withdrew three days before the election and endorsed Yona Yahav.

Publications
 Loved and Hated: Women in the Bible, Midrash and Modern Hebrew Literature

References

Israeli women ambassadors
Ambassadors of Israel to Russia
Hebrew University of Jerusalem alumni
Academic staff of the University of Haifa
People from Rosh Pinna
21st-century Israeli women writers
People from Haifa
Israeli women academics
Presidents of universities in Israel
Deputy Mayors of Haifa
Year of birth missing (living people)
Living people